The Feasting Dead is a horror novel by British writer  John Metcalfe.  It was published by Arkham House in 1954 in an edition of 1,242 copies.  It was the only book published by Arkham House in 1954. A new edition was issued by Valancourt Books in 2014.

Plot summary

The story is about a young English boy, Denis, who, while in France falls under the influence of a vampiric being, from the folklore of Auvergne and the misfortune that befalls him.

Reception
Boucher and McComas praised the novel as "highly welcome in a period where literate supernatural horror is so rare."

References

Sources

1954 British novels
British horror novels
Novels set in France